Adolf Hitler's private library was Adolf Hitler's private collection of books, excluding books he purchased for the German state library. Baldur von Schirach, the leader of the Hitlerjugend, claimed that Hitler had about 6,000 volumes and that he had read each one. Tyler James Oechsner put his collection at 16,300 volumes. No records exist to confirm this amount as several books were destroyed by The Allies.

Although contemporaries say that he loved reading works by German authors, Nietzsche in particular, "there is no sign of Goethe, Schiller, Schopenhauer or Nietzsche in his library." He is said to have believed that Shakespeare was far superior to Goethe and Schiller. He had a copy of 's 1925 translation of Shakespeare's collected works. He was fond of quoting certain lines throughout his life. Copies of Goethe, Schiller, Dante, and Schopenhauer may have been destroyed by Allied bombing so there is no way of knowing for certain whether his collection was lacking. His collection is said to have included "first editions of works by philosophers, historians, poets, playwrights, and novelists." He owned illustrated copies of Don Quixote and Robinson Crusoe, which he ranked, along with Gulliver's Travels and Uncle Tom's Cabin, as the great works of world literature. Hitler himself was a voracious reader: he claimed to read at least one book a night, if not more. He was also given books as gifts by females of his acquaintance. "The only outstanding classical literary text found in his library today is the collected writings of Kleist."

History
The first description of his private collection was published in 1942. Hitler's private books that were kept in the Reich Chancellery in Berlin were confiscated by the Soviets and sent to Moscow. Books in Munich and Berchtesgaden (as well as Hitler's Globe from Berchtesgaden) were taken as war booty by individual American soldiers. Three thousand volumes were later discovered in a Berchtesgaden salt mine, and they were taken by the Library of Congress. The largest volume that has been recovered is about the German colonies, with a dedication written to Hitler, encouraging the "re-acquisition of the colonies." They are now in a special locked room in the Library of Congress where they can be accessed five at a time and read in the rare book reading room. Eighty books that belonged to Hitler were identified in the basement of Brown University.

References

Further reading

Adolf Hitler
Private libraries
Libraries in Germany
Library of Congress